Routh Mounds is a Plaquemine culture archaeological site in Tensas Parish, Louisiana. It is the type site for the Routh Phase(1200 to 1350 CE) of the Tensas Basin Plaquemine Mississippian chronology.

See also
Culture, phase, and chronological table for the Mississippi Valley

References

External links

Plaquemine Mississippian culture
Mounds in Louisiana
Geography of Tensas Parish, Louisiana